Clemens Aigner  (born 2 February 1993) is an Austrian ski jumper who competes internationally.

He competed at the 2018 Winter Olympics.

References

External links

1993 births
Living people
Austrian male ski jumpers 
Olympic ski jumpers of Austria 
Ski jumpers at the 2018 Winter Olympics 
Universiade bronze medalists for Austria
Universiade medalists in ski jumping
Competitors at the 2013 Winter Universiade
21st-century Austrian people